Several ships have been named Trent:

 was launched at Hull. She was lost on Hogland, Russia in 1791 as she was sailing from London to Saint Petersburg, Russia.
, of 284 tons (bm), was launched by Edward Morley, Howden. She suffered major misfortunes in 1836 and 1843, and was wrecked in 1856.

See also
 - any one of six vessels

Citations

Ship names